The Luxembourg Open was a golf tournament on the Challenge Tour. It was played annually at Kikuoka Country Club in Luxembourg from 1999 to 2003.

Winners

References

External links
Coverage on the Challenge Tour's official site

Former Challenge Tour events
Golf tournaments in Luxembourg